

Wulfsige (or Wulfsige II) was a medieval Bishop of Sherborne.

Wulfsige was consecrated between 939 and 943. He died after 958 to sometime around 963.

Citations

References

External links
 

Bishops of Sherborne (ancient)
10th-century English bishops